The Lowell Regional Transit Authority (LRTA) is a public, non-profit organization in Massachusetts, charged with providing public transportation to the Greater Lowell area.  This primarily includes the city of Lowell and the towns of Billerica, Burlington, Dracut, Chelmsford, Tewksbury, Tyngsborough,  Westford and Wilmington.  The LRTA provides fixed route bus services and paratransit services within this area, although some fixed lines do extend beyond these towns.

The LRTA was created in September 1974 under Chapter 161B of the Massachusetts General Laws, the law that impacts all transit authorities in the state of Massachusetts. Since 2004, operation of the LRTA has been subcontracted to First Transit, a subsidiary of the United Kingdom based FirstGroup.

The area served by the LRTA is within the commuter rail service area of the Massachusetts Bay Transportation Authority (MBTA). At the Gallagher Transit Terminal in Lowell, LRTA buses provide connection to each other, to trains on MBTA's Lowell Line, and to various intercity bus routes.

Routes
All of the routes serve Monday through Friday and most provide Saturday service. All routes originate at the LRTA Gallagher Terminal in Lowell.

Fleet
The LRTA owns a fleet of 108 revenue-producing vehicles, which includes 57 Gillig Low Floor buses for scheduled route service and 49 Ford Transit and 2 Ford E450 minibuses for paratransit service.

Gallery

References

External links

LRTA official website

1974 establishments in Massachusetts
Bus transportation in Massachusetts
Government agencies established in 1974
Transportation in Lowell, Massachusetts
Transportation in Middlesex County, Massachusetts